Carl Roland Fredrik Lundh Sammeli (born 1977) is a Swedish politician, air force officer and member of the Riksdag, the national legislature. A member of the Social Democratic Party, he has represented Norrbotten County since October 2006.

Lundh Sammeli is the son of Ebbe Lundh and Chatrine Lundh (née Nilsson). He was educated in Piteå and at the Air Force Officers College (FOHS) in Halmstad. He has been an officer in the Norrbotten Wing since 1999. He has been a member of the municipal council in Luleå Municipality from 2002 until 2018, and on it's municipal board from 2002 to 2006.  Since 2015 he has been the chairman of the local Social Democratic Party in Norrbotten and a member of the national party board.

References

1977 births
Living people
Members of the Riksdag 2006–2010
Members of the Riksdag 2010–2014
Members of the Riksdag 2014–2018
Members of the Riksdag 2018–2022
Members of the Riksdag 2022–2026
Members of the Riksdag from the Social Democrats
People from Luleå Municipality
Swedish Air Force officers